Cinquième As is the fifth studio album by MC Solaar, and was released in 2001. It is slightly different from his previous works because of a stronger emphasis on a string background. The album gained exposure in the United States after "La Belle et le Bad Boy" was heard on an episode of Sex and the City. Musically, the album features more R&B themes featuring a layering of a female voice on a few tracks, and it is especially notable and true to the MC Solaar character which is strong emotion expressed in the delivery and lyrics. The album pays tribute to Senegal, where he spent his childhood. He uses the album to condemn the role of the World Bank in developing nations. This is most apparent on the track "Les Colonies," where the lyrics state, "Dans cette ère de négoce où ne vivent que les big boss/ Rentabilité - instabilité - imbécillité/ N'ont fait qu'augmenter les taux de mortalité," meaning, "In this era of trade where only the big bosses live/ Profitability - instability - imbecility/ Have done nothing but increase rates of mortality," referring to policies of the International Monetary Fund and World Bank.

MC Solaar also discusses the condition of African immigrants in France. He himself emigrated with his family to the suburbs of Paris as a teenager, and he talks about this experience in the song "Leve-toi et rap". MC Solaar's message is seen throughout the lyrics and the visual design of the album. The album cover is a picture of a group of men, including the artist himself, all shirtless, as if trying to convey an image of slaves about to embark on a slave ship. However, upon taking a closer look, it appears that the men are African wrestlers. The theme of wrestling and fighters pays homage to the African presence in France.

Track listing 
 Introdiction  – 1:53  	    	 
 "Solaar Pleure" – 4:57 	  	
 "Lève-Toi et Rap" – 3:29	  	
 "Les Colonies" – 4:01
 "Hasta la vista mi amor!" (intro) – 0:15
 "Hasta la vista mi amor!" – 3:23 -Produced by Kurser/ Fabrice		  	
 "La Belle et le Bad Boy" – 3:12 -Produced by Kurser/ Fabrice	 	
 "La La La, La" – 3:51 -Produced by Kurser/ Fabrice	  	
 "Arkansas" – 1:39 	  	
 "Baby Love" – 4:07 	
 "Dégâts collatéraux" – 4:00 -Produced by Kurser/ Fabrice		  	
 "RMI" – 4:19 	  	
 "C'est ça que les gens veulent" (feat. 9respect) – 4:05  	
 "L'aigle ne chasse pas les mouches" – 3:12 -co-Produced by Kurser/ Fabrice	  	
 "Hiphopaloorap" (feat. Don Xeré Delavega) – 1:45 	  	
 "Le Cinquième As" – 3:48 -Produced by Kurser/ Fabrice		  	
 "Playmate" – 3:02 	  	
 "L'homme qui voulait 3 milliards" (feat. Bambi Cruz) – 3:03	
 "Si je meurs ce soir" (feat. Black Jack) – 3:59 	  	
 "Samedi Soir" (hidden track) – 2:21

Charts

Weekly charts

Year-end charts

Certifications

References

2001 albums
MC Solaar albums